Postplatyptilia huigraica is a moth of the family Pterophoridae. It is known from Brazil, Colombia, Costa Rica, Ecuador, Peru and Venezuela.

The wingspan is 14–15 mm. Adults are on wing in February, June, August, and from October to December.

Etymology
The name of this new species is derived from the name of the type locality.

References

huigraica
Moths described in 1992